Panna Ugrai (born 18 October 2004) is a Hungarian swimmer. She competed in the women's 4 × 100 metre freestyle relay event at the 2020 European Aquatics Championships, in Budapest, Hungary, reaching the final.

References

External links
 

2004 births
Living people
Hungarian female medley swimmers
Hungarian female freestyle swimmers
Place of birth missing (living people)
21st-century Hungarian women
Competitors at the 2022 World Games
World Games silver medalists